Robert Kane may refer to:

 Bob Kane (born Robert Kahn, 1915–1998), co-creator of Batman
 Rob Kane (1967–2021), American politician in Connecticut
 Robert Kane (born 1954), British musician with Dr. Feelgood
 Robert Kane (chemist) (1809–1890), Irish chemist
 Robert Kane (producer) (1886–1957), American film producer (Blood and Sand)
 Robert Kane (philosopher) (born 1938), American philosopher
 Robert Kane (sports administrator) (1911–1992), president of the United States Olympic Committee
 Robert F. Kane (1926–2007), U.S. Ambassador to Ireland, 1984–1985
 Robert Romney Kane (1842–1902), Irish barrister and legal writer

See also
Robert Cain (disambiguation)
Robert Cane (1807–1858), Irish editor